Joe Amstutz (born October 12, 1934) was a former American football center. He played for the Cleveland Browns in 1957.

References

1934 births
Living people
American football centers
Indiana Hoosiers football players
Cleveland Browns players